Maigret a Pigalle (Maigret in Pigalle) is a 1966 Italian crime film directed by Mario Landi. It is based on the novel Maigret al Picratt's by Georges Simenon.

Synopsis
One evening, Arlette, a stripper in a Paris nightclub called the "Picrate" in Pigalle, walks into a police station to inform Inspector Lognon of a crime. She overheard two strangers planning to assassinate an old countess in order to rob her of her gold. Nobody gives her any consideration, but in the following hours, the bodies of Arlette and the noblewoman are found; both died by strangulation. Inspector Maigret is about to depart for his annual leave, but he decides to stay in town to help his colleague Lognon in the investigations.

Cast 
Gino Cervi: Maigret
Lila Kedrova: Rose
Raymond Pellegrin: Fred
Alfred Adam: Lognon
Josè Greci: Arlette
 Christian Barbier :  Torrence
Enzo Cerusico: Albert
Riccardo Garrone: La Pointe 
Armando Bandini: Gatekeeper at Picrate 
Mario Feliciani: Director of the Criminal Investigation
Marie-France Pisier (uncredited)

See also 
Le inchieste del commissario Maigret (TV series, 1964–1972)

References

External links
 

1966 films
Italian mystery films
1960s Italian-language films
1960s crime films
Maigret films
Police detective films
Films directed by Mario Landi
Films scored by Armando Trovajoli
Films based on television series
1960s police procedural films
1960s Italian films